Phylladiorhynchus ikedai is a species of squat lobster in the family Galatheidae.

References

Squat lobsters
Crustaceans described in 1965